Ky-Mani Marley (born 26 February 1976) is a Jamaican reggae musician. In 2001, he received a Grammy nomination for his album, Many More Roads. He is the only child of reggae musician Bob Marley with Anita Belnavis, a Jamaican table tennis champion.

Early life and family
Ky-Mani Marley was born in Falmouth, Jamaica, to Anita Belnavis and Bob Marley. When Marley was five years old, his father died of cancer. At the age of nine, Marley and his mother relocated to Miami, Florida. His taste in music was informed by the music he heard on American radio stations, especially hip-hop, rock, and pop. In his early youth, Marley was focused on sports. As an athlete, he competed in soccer and American football. With his mother's direction, he received piano and guitar lessons and played trumpet in his high school band.

Career
While a teenager, Marley started rapping and deejaying. His first single was "Unnecessary Badness". He became inspired as a singer after being asked to sing a hook to a song during a recording session at a studio in Miami. Marley soon began experimenting with laying tracks, at times with his brothers Stephen, Julian, and Damian.

Marley signed to Shang Records where he recorded his debut album in 1996, Like Father Like Son, and several singles: "Judge Not" with Patra, followed by "Dear Dad" (which topped the British reggae charts), "Who The Cap Fit (remix)", and "Sensimelia", all of which added to his growing reputation in the new generation of reggae musicians. In 1997, Marley joined forces with Pras of the Fugees, on "Avenue", a hit cover of Eddy Grant's "Electric Avenue". Marley appeared at international music showcase Midem when it was held in Miami for the first time. At the Cameo Theatre, Marley performed a set which was aired live by the Caribbean News Agency to 36 countries.

Marley became the subject of a bidding war. He signed with Gee Street/V2 Records in 1997 where he completed a collaboration with label mate P.M. Dawn on the single "Gotta Be Movin' On Up".

Marley's next recording was the 2000 release, The Journey. In 2001, he released his third studio album Many More Roads, which was nominated for a Grammy Award, and went on tour. In 2004 he released his fourth studio album, Milestone. In 2007, he released Radio. Also in 2007, Marley joined Van Halen on tour as their opening act. In 2015, he released another album, Maestro.

In 2019, Marley collaborated with XXXTentacion, Stefflon Don, and Vybz Kartel on the single "Royalty". He also appeared in the music video, which was filmed after the death of XXXTentacion.

Marley's acting work included lead roles in the Jamaican films Shottas and One Love.

Personal life 
Marley is married to Janie E. K. Green.

Discography 
Like Father Like Son (1996)
The Journey (2000)
Many More Roads (2001)
Milestone (2004)
Radio (2007)
"New Heights" [Single] (2012)
Maestro (2015)
Conversations (2016) with Gentleman

Guest appearances

Filmography
Shottas (2002)
One Love (2003)
Haven (2004)
Eenie Meenie Miney Moe (2013)
King of the Dancehall (2016)

References

External links

 

1976 births
Living people
Jamaican people of English descent
Jamaican male singers
Jamaican reggae musicians
Jamaican reggae singers
K
Gee Street Records artists